170 (one hundred [and] seventy) is the natural number following 169 and preceding 171.

In mathematics

170 is the smallest n for which φ(n) and σ(n) are both square (64 and 324 respectively). But 170 is never a solution for φ(x), making it a nontotient. Nor is it ever a solution to x - φ(x), making it a noncototient.

170 is a repdigit in base 4 (2222) and base 16 (AA), as well as in bases 33, 84, and 169. It is also a sphenic number.

170 is the largest integer for which its factorial can be stored in IEEE 754 double-precision floating-point format. This is probably why it is also the largest factorial that Google's built-in calculator will calculate, returning the answer as 170! = 7.25741562 × 10306.

There are 170 different cyclic Gilbreath permutations on 12 elements, and therefore there are 170 different real periodic points of order 12 on the Mandelbrot set.

See also
 170s
 E170 (disambiguation)
 F170 (disambiguation)
 List of highways numbered 170
 United States Supreme Court cases, Volume 170
 United Nations Security Council Resolution 170
 Pennsylvania House of Representatives, District 170

References

External links

 The Number 170
 Number Facts and Trivia: 170
 The Positive Integer 170
 Prime curiosities: 170

Integers